The discography of Australian rock singer-songwriter Matt Corby consists of two studio albums, seven extended plays and nineteen singles.

Studio albums

Extended plays

Singles

Other charted songs

Music videos

Notes

References

Discographies of Australian artists
Pop music group discographies